Hazaragi is an eastern dialect of Persian that is spoken by the Hazara people, primarily in the Hazarajat region of central Afghanistan, as well as other Hazara-populated areas of Afghanistan. It is also spoken by the Hazaras of Pakistan and Iran and also by the Hazara diaspora living elsewhere.

Classification 
Hazaragi is a member of the Iranian branch of the Indo-European language family. It is an eastern variety of Persian closely related to the Dari language of Afghanistan. The primary differences between Dari and Hazaragi are the accents and Hazaragi's greater array of many Turkic and a few Mongolic loanwords. Despite these differences, the two dialects are mutually intelligible.

Geographic distribution and diaspora 

Hazaragi is spoken by the Hazara people, who mainly live in Afghanistan (predominantly in the Hazarajat region, as well as in major urban areas), with a significant population in Pakistan (particularly Quetta) and Iran (particularly Mashhad), and by Hazara diaspora in eastern Uzbekistan, northern Tajikistan, the Americas, Europe, and Australia.

In recent years, a substantial population of Hazara refugees have settled in Australia, prompting the Department of Immigration and Citizenship to move towards an official recognition of the Hazaragi language. Currently, NAATI (National Accreditation Authority for Translators and Interpreters) holds interpreting tests for Hazaragi as a distinct language, noting in test materials that Hazaragi varies by dialect, and that any dialect of Hazaragi may be used in interpreter testing as long as it would be understood by the average speaker.  The test materials also note that Hazaragi in some locations has been significantly influenced by surrounding languages, and that the use of non-Hazaragi words assimilated from neighboring languages would be penalized in testing.

History

Persian and Islam 

The Persian language became so much part of the religion of Islam that it almost went wherever Islam took roots. Persian entered, in this way, into the very faith and thought of the people embracing Islam throughout South Asia.

Turkic and Mongolic influence 
Over the time, some of the Turkic and Mongolic languages died out in Afghanistan as living languages amongst some Hazaras. However, Hazaragi contains many Turkic and a few Mongolic loanwords.

Grammatical structure 
The grammatical structure of Hazaragi is practically identical with that of the Kabuli dialect of Persian.

Phonology

Persian ); and rarely articulates . The convergence of voiced uvular stop  (ق) and voiced velar fricative  (غ) in Western Persian (probably under the influence of Turkic languages) is still kept separate in Hazara.

Persian ,). Persian ). 

Stress is dynamic and similar to that in Dari and Tajik varieties of Persian, and not variable. It generally falls on the last syllable of a nominal form, including derivative suffixes and a number of morphological markers. Typical is the insertion of epenthetic vowels in consonant clusters (as in pašm to póšum; "wool") and final devoicing (as in ḵût; "self, own").

 only occurs infrequently, and among more educated speakers.  can be heard as either a trill  or a tap . // can also range to uvular sounds [].

Nominal morphology 
The most productive derivative marker is -i, and the plural markers are -o for the inanimate (as in kitab-o, meaning "books"; cf. Persian ) and -û for the animate (as in birar-û, meaning "brothers"; cf. Persian ). The emphatic vocative marker is û or -o, the indefinite marker is -i, and the specific object marker is -(r)a. The comparative marker is -tar (as in kalû-tar, meaning "bigger"). Dependent adjectives and nouns follow the head noun and are connected by -i (as in kitab-i mamud, meaning "the book of Maḥmud"). Topicalized possessors precede the head noun marked by the resumptive personal suffix (as in Zulmay ayê-ši, literally "Zulmay her mother"). Prepositions include, in addition to the standard Persian ones, ḵun(i) (meaning "with, by means of", da (meaning "in"; cf. Persian ); the latter often replaces ba (meaning "to") in dative function. Loaned postpositions include comitative -qati (meaning "together with") and (az) -worî (meaning "like"). Interrogatives typically function also as indefinites (as in kudam, meaning "which, someone").

The inflection (u,o) that Hazaras use to pluralize nouns is Also found in Avesta, Yashts such as Aryo.

Particles, conjunctions, modals, and adverbials 
These include atê/arê, meaning "yes"; amma or wali, meaning "but"; balki, meaning "however"; šaydi, meaning "perhaps"; ale, meaning "now"; and wuḵt-a, meaning "then". These are also marked by distinctive initial stress.

Verb morphology 
The imperfective marker is mi- (assimilated variants: m-, mu-, m-, mê-; as in mi-zan-um, "I hit, I am hitting"). The subjunctive and imperative marker is bi- (with similar assimilation). The negation is na- (as in na-mi-zad-um, "I was not hitting"). These usually attract stress.

Tenses 
The tense, mood, and aspect system is typically quite different from western Persian. The basic tense system is threefold: present-future, past, and remote (pluperfect). New modal paradigms developed in addition to the subjunctives:

 The non-seen/mirative that originates in the resultative-stative perfect (e.g., zad-ēm; cf. Persian ), which has largely lost its non-modal use;
 the potential, or assumptive, which is marked by the invariant ḵot (cf. Persian xāh-ad or xād, "it wants, intends") combined with the indicate and subjunctive forms.

Moreover, all past and remote forms have developed imperfective forms marked by mi-. There are doubts about several of the less commonly found, or recorded, forms, in particular those with ḵot. However, the systematic arrangement of all forms according to their morphological, as well as semantic, function shows that those forms fit well within the overall pattern. The system may tentatively be shown as follows (all forms are 1st sing), leaving out complex compound forms such as zada ḵot mu-buda baš-um.

In the assumptive, the distinction appears to be not between present versus past, but indefinite versus definite. Also, similar to all Persian varieties, the imperfective forms in mi-, and past perfect forms, such as mi-zad-um and zada bud-um, are used in irreal conditional clauses and wishes; e.g., kaški zimi qulba kadagi mu-but, "If the field would only be/have been plowed!" Modal verbs, such as tan- ("can"), are constructed with the perfect participle; e.g., ma bû-r-um, da čaman rasid-a ḵot tanist-um, "I shall go, and may be able to get to Čaman". Participial nominalization is typical, both with the perfect participle (e.g., kad-a, "(having) done") and with the derived participle with passive meaning kad-ag-i, "having been done" (e.g., zimin-i qulba kada-ya, "The field is ploughed"; zamin-i qulba (na-)šuda-ra mi-ngar-um, "I am looking at a plowed/unplowed field"; imrûz [u ḵondagi] tikrar mu-kun-a, "Today he repeats (reading) what he had read"). The gerundive (e.g., kad-an-i, "to be done") is likewise productive, as in yag čiz, ki uftadani baš-a, ma u-ra qad-dist-ḵu girift-um, tulḡa kad-um, "One object, that was about to fall, I grabbed, and held it". The clitic -ku or -ḵu topicalizes parts of speech, -di the predicate; as in i-yši raft, ma-ḵu da ḵona mand-um, "He himself left; I, though, I stayed".

See also 

 Aimaq dialect

References

External links 

 Map of the Hazaragi dialect in Afghanistan

 
Eastern Persian dialects in Afghanistan
Languages of Afghanistan
Languages of Iran
Languages of Tajikistan
Persian language in Pakistan
Languages of Balochistan, Pakistan
Languages of Khyber Pakhtunkhwa